Wai Caves are 9 Buddhist Caves, situated at Lonara, 7 km north of Wai. 
The Chaitya hall containing a Stupa has since been converted into a Shiva temple.

References

Buddhist caves in India
Indian rock-cut architecture
Former populated places in India
Caves of Maharashtra
Buddhist pilgrimage sites in India